Dalbergia rimosa is a species of liana (or treelet), with the Vietnamese name trắc giây or trắc dây. The synonym Dalbergia discolor, with the Vietnamese name trắc biến màu, is no longer recognised. The genus Dalbergia is placed in the subfamily Faboideae and tribe Dalbergieae.

Subspecies 
The Catalogue of Life lists:
 D. r. foliacea (Benth.) Thoth.  (Vietnamese: trắc lá)
 D. r. griffithii
 D. r. laevis
 D. r. rimosa

References

External links

rimosa
Flora of Indo-China
Flora of India (region)